Federal University Oye Ekiti is a government owned and operated Nigerian university. The university is in the ancient city of Oye-Ekiti and Ikole-Ekiti making it two campuses. The university was founded in 2011 as one of the federal universities established by the federal government of Nigeria, led by President Goodluck Jonathan.

Undergraduate

Federal University Oye Ekiti offers undergraduate programmes in fields of specialization spanning Agriculture, Arts, Law, Management sciences,  the Social Sciences, Engineering, Education, Pharmacy, Medical Sciences and Sciences.

The university has ten faculties and a school of postgraduate studies.

The Federal University Oye-Ekiti is a Federal University of Nigeria, poised to take education to the next level not only in sub-saharan Africa but indeed to the rest of the world. Established in 2011, offers students from all backgrounds degrees in Agriculture, Engineering, Social Sciences and Sciences as well as Arts, Law, Management Sciences, Pharmacy and Education.
The school had their first graduating set in 2015, with maiden convocation in April, 2017.

Federal University Oye-Ekiti (FUOYE) was one of the nine Federal Universities established by the Federal Government of Nigeria, pursuant to an executive order made by the former President of the Federal Republic of Nigeria, His Excellency, Dr. Goodluck Ebele Jonathan, GCFR.
Federal University Oye-Ekiti, whose pioneer Vice Chancellor, was Professor Chinedu Ostadinma Nebo, OON, and was succeeded by Vice Chancellor Professor Kayode Soremekun who was appointed by President Buhari in 2016. The current Vice chancellor of the school is Professor A.S Fasina, 
the  varsity has two campuses at Oye-Ekiti and Ikole-Ekiti and 8 Faculties with 57 Departments, namely:

The Faculty of Agriculture (Agricultural Economics and Extension, Fisheries and Aquaculture, Soil and land management, Animal production and health, Crop Production and Horticulture, Food Science Technology, Water Resources and Meteorology, Tourism and hospitality)
The Faculty of Engineering (Agricultural and Bio-Resources Engineering, Civil Engineering, Computer Engineering, Electrical and Electronics Engineering, Mechanical and Mechatronics Engineering, Material and Metallurgical Engineering)
 The Faculty of Social Sciences (Demography and Social Statistics, Economics and Development Studies, Psychology, Sociology, Peace and Conflict Resolution, Political Science, Mass Communication)
The Faculty of Arts/Humanities (English and Literary Studies, Theatre and Media Arts, History and International Relations, Linguistics )
The Faculty of Science (Animal and Environmental Biology, Biochemistry, Geology, Computer Science, Geophysics, Industrial Chemistry, Mathematics, Microbiology, Physics, Plant Science and Biotechnology)
The Faculty of Education (Mathematics Education, English Education, Biology Education, Library and Information Science, Chemistry Education, Business Education, Agricultural Education and Educational Management)
The Faculty of Management (Accounting, Finance, Public Administration, Business Administration).
The Faculty of Law
The Faculty of Pharmacy

The university is looking forward to the start of two faculties in the next academic session, namely; Basic Medical Science whose department includes; Anatomy, Medical laboratory science, Physiology, Nursing and Radiography/Radiology and radiation sciences and Environmental science whose department includes; Architecture, Building, Estate Management, Surveying and Geoinformatics, Quantity Surveying, Urban and Regional Planning with required infrastructures being put in place. 

The first vice-chancellor of the new university was Chinedu Nebo succeeded by Kayode Soremekun and the current vice-chancellor is professor A.S Fasina.

References 

Federal universities of Nigeria
Education in Ekiti State
Educational institutions established in 2011
2011 establishments in Nigeria